Allium tardiflorum is a plant species found in Israel. It is a bulb-forming perennial producing an umbel of flowers late in the season, in September or October. Flowers are on long pedicels, forming a lax umbel. Tepals are green with purple midveins and purple margins.

References

tardiflorum
Onions
Flora of Israel
Flora of Palestine (region)
Plants described in 1991